This is a list of male Gaelic footballers who have played on a winning team in the final of the All-Ireland Senior Football Championship.

In 2005, a gold medal won by the first final's man-of-the-match Malachi O'Brien fetched €26,500 (three times its guide price) at London auction house Sotheby's. It is believed to be the oldest All-Ireland football medal in existence.

Players are organised by year of first medal, then number of medals, then surname.

References

Players
Lists of Gaelic football players
Winners of All-Ireland medals by count (Gaelic football)